Eatoniella pullmitra is a species of marine gastropod mollusc in the family Eatoniellidae. First described by Winston Ponder in 1965, it is endemic to the waters of New Zealand. The species has a preference for living on algae found in the sublittoral zone.

Description

Eatoniella pullmitra has a smooth, ovate shell with four whorls. The shell is yellowish-white, with a semi-transparent aperture and a white umbilical area. The holotype measured 1.23mm by 0.85mm.

The species is similar in appearance to Eatoniella atervisceralis and Eatoniella dilatata, but can be distinguished by its broader shell and larger umbilicus.

Distribution

The species is endemic to New Zealand. The holotype was collected by Ponder himself on 4 September 1964, on soft brown algae adjacent to Quarantine Island in the Otago Harbour. 

The species has a preference for living in the sublittoral zone of the waters of New Zealand, and is found in the North Island, South Island, Steward Island, the Chatham Islands and the Bounty Islands. It has also been recorded living in the littoral zone in Otago Harbour.

References

Eatoniellidae
Gastropods described in 1965
Gastropods of New Zealand
Endemic fauna of New Zealand
Endemic molluscs of New Zealand
Molluscs of the Pacific Ocean
Taxa named by Winston Ponder